Lance-Adams syndrome (LAS) is a sequela of hypoxic encephalopathy due to respiratory arrest, airway obstruction, cardiac arrest, etc. , several days after the onset of hypoxic encephalopathy. A condition that presents with functional myoclonus associated with increased cortical excitability in a few weeks. It was first reported by James Lance and Raymond Adams in 1963.

It is a disease that presents Myoclonus  as a sequela of hypoxic disorders in the brain due to asphyxiation and cardiopulmonary arrest. It is exacerbated by mental and physical anxiety such as intention, intentional movement, and tension.

Pathology 
It appears due to Basal ganglia lesions due to hypoxic encephalopathy  .

Treatment
Clonazepam and Valproate , which enhance serotonin and GABAA receptor, are widely used as therapeutic agents . It has been reported that Levetiracetam was effective in cases in which clonazepam and valproic acid were ineffective. Other reports have shown that piracetam has been shown to be effective.

Perampanel  
From around 2017, reports that Perampanel are effective have been gathered, and cases of complete cure have been reported.

In April 2021, a group at Kyoto University reported a case of Lance Adams syndrome 11 years after onset due to hypoxic encephalopathy caused by a bronchial asthma attack, and in March 2022, a group at Kitasato University reported a case of Lance Adams syndrome after a hanging neck injury 1 year and 6 months after onset. There are an increasing number of reports showing improvement even in chronic cases, such as a case report of a patient who was able to hold a standing position after treatment with perampanel and significant improvement in motor myoclonus.

References

Medical signs
Brain disorders
Extrapyramidal and movement disorders
Neurological disorders
Neurology
Wikipedia neurology articles ready to translate